The 494th Bombardment Squadron is an inactive United States Air Force unit, assigned to the 344th Bombardment Group, The squadron was activated in September 1942, and until July 1943 served as a Replacement Training Unit.  It then began training for combat operations, deploying to the European Theater of Operations in January 1944.  It participated in combat, earning a Distinguished Unit Citation for air support of ground troops during Operation Cobra.  After V-E Day, the squadron became part of the occupation forces until it was inactivated on 31 March 1946.

History

Training in the United States
The squadron was activated in September 1943 at MacDill Field, Florida as one of the original squadrons of the 344th Bombardment Group.  In December, the group moved to nearby Drane Field, Florida.  The unit served as a Replacement Training Unit (RTU) for Martin B-26 Marauders. RTUs were oversized units to that trained individual pilots or aircrews.

In July 1943, the squadron stopped training other crews and began training to enter combat.  It completed its training at Hunter Field, Georgia, and departed for the European Theater of Operations on 26 January 1944.

Combat in Europe
The squadron arrived at its first combat station, RAF Stansted Mountfitchet on 8 February 1944, where the unit became part of IX Bomber Command.   The squadronngaged in tactical bombardment of enemy targets in Occupied Europe initially from stations in England, then after D-Day, moved to Advanced Landing Grounds in France and Belgium; advancing eastward as Allied ground forces advanced.   Supported Eighth Air Force strategic bombardment missions over Germany and Occupied Europe; striking enemy airfields to obtain maximum interference in Luftwaffe day interceptor attacks on heavy bomber formations returning to England.  Also participated in Western Allied Invasion of Germany, March–April 1945, combat ending with German Capitation in May 1945.

Occupation duty and return to the United States
The squadron remained in Germany as part of the United States Air Forces in Europe's  occupation forces, moving to Schleissheim Airfield, near Munich, in September.  In late 1945, the squadron began training on the Douglas A-26 Invader, but continued to fly Marauders as well.  On 15 February 1946, the squadron's personnel and aircraft were withdrawn and it moved on paper to Bolling Field, District of Columbia, where it inactivated at the end of March.

Lineage
 Constituted as the 494th Bombardment Squadron (Medium) on 31 August 1942
 Activated on 8 September 1942
 Redesignated 494th Bombardment Squadron, Medium in 1944
 Redesignated 494th Bombardment Squadron, Light on 3 December 1945
 Inactivated on 30 December 1945

Assignments
 344th Bombardment Group, 8 September 1942 – 31 March 1946

Stations
 MacDill Field, Florida, 8 September 1942
 Drane Field, Florida, 28 December 1942
 Hunter Field, Georgia, 19 December 1943 – 26 January 1944
 RAF Stansted Mountfitchet (AAF-169), England, 8 February 1944
 Cormeilles-en-Vexin Airfield (A-59), France, 30 September 1944
 Florennes/Juzaine Airfield (A-78), Belgium, 4 April 1945
 Schleissheim Airfield (R-75), Germany, 15 September 1945 – 15 February 1946
 Bolling Field, District of Columbia, 15 February 1946 – 31 March 1946

Aircraft
 Martin B-26 Marauder, 1942–1946
 Douglas A-26 Invader, 1945–1946

References

Notes
 Explanatory notes

 Citations

Bibliography

 
 
 
 
 
 

Bombardment squadrons of the United States Army Air Forces
Military units and formations established in 1942